The Message is the sixth studio album by American singer Chi Coltrane, released in 1986 by German label Teldec. "I Didn't Want to Fall in Love" was the sole single to be released from the album.

Critical reception

In a retrospective review for AllMusic, critic Charles Donovan wrote that "The Message follows the same pattern as Ready to Roll -- a grab-bag of uptempo, synth numbers, and languid ballads.", adding that "As before, nothing here wrenches the heart in the way Coltrane's first few albums did."

Track listing

Personnel
Credits are adapted from the liner notes of The Message.
 Chi Coltrane — lead and background vocals; keyboards; grand piano
 Laurence Cottle — bass guitar
 Stuart Elliott — drums; percussion
 Haydn Bendall — percussion
 Richard Cottle — saxophone
 Phil Smith — saxophone
 Neal Sidwell — trombone
 Steve Sidwell — trumpet
 Paul Carman — backing vocals
 Peter King — backing vocals
 Sheila Parker — backing vocals
 Sheryl Parker — backing vocals
 Carl Jones — backing vocals on "Work to Make Money"

Production and artwork
 Chi Coltrane – producer
 Haydn Bendall – engineer
 BN – mastering engineer
 Carsten Maass – design; cover

References

External links
 

Chi Coltrane albums
1986 albums
Pop rock albums by American artists